Mirosław Mariusz Piotrowski (born 9 January 1966 in Zielona Góra) is an independent Polish politician and Member of the European Parliament (MEP).  He was originally elected in 2004 with the League of Polish Families, then part of the Independence and Democracy grouping.  At the 2009 election, he was re-elected for Law and Justice.

He left Law and Justice in January 2012 and to sit as an independent MEP in the European Conservatives and Reformists group, alongside Law and Justice, but became reconciled with his old party, to again become its representative for the 2014 European Parliamentary elections.

Piotrowski was a member of the European Parliament's Committee on Foreign Affairs.  He was a substitute for the Committee on Regional Development and a vice-chair of the Delegation for Relations with Australia and New Zealand.

He participated in the 2020 Polish presidential election during which he received 21,065 votes (0.11%), coming last out of eleven candidates.

Education
 2003: Masters (1990), Doctorate (1993), Catholic University of Lublin (KUL), assistant professor, Nicolas Copernicus University (2001) and associate professor KUL

Career
 1994-2000: Scholarships from the Herder Institut (Germany), Konrad Adenauer Foundation (Germany), Conference of German Academies of Sciences (Germany), the Foundation for Polish Science (Poland), and the University of Leuven (Belgium).
 2002: Prize of the Prime Minister of the Republic of Poland awarded to the qualifying thesis for an assistant professorship on the remigration of Poles from Germany 1918-1939 'Reemigracja Polaków z Niemiec 1918-1939'

Footnotes

External links

  
 
 

1966 births
Living people
People from Zielona Góra
John Paul II Catholic University of Lublin alumni
Law and Justice MEPs
League of Polish Families MEPs
MEPs for Poland 2004–2009
MEPs for Poland 2009–2014
MEPs for Poland 2014–2019
Candidates in the 2020 Polish presidential election